is a 1986 science fiction horror original video animation  directed by Hisashi Sugai. It was released on September 10, 1986.

The story is that of a research crew on a space station find a desolate ship with only one survivor. The crew is then stalked by a psychic alien who wishes to kill them. The plot and setting bears a lot of similarities to the 1979 film Alien.

Plot
Research station, four scientists. A small ship, the Green Planet, falls out of hyperspace at this station. 9 crew members are dead, only Assistant Captain Buzz survived. Scientists carry the guy to the station, and with it - a strange alien who does not show signs of life. At the insistence of the chief, the alien body is thrown into space. And then scientists are haunted by the memories of the meanness they have committed in life, dead friends, acquaintances and lovers cry for vengeance. Scientists are dying all but the only lady who falls in love with Buzz. Alien claims he was sent by God to punish mankind for sins. Buzz and the girl blow up the station, but do not have time to escape themselves.

Voice actors

Banjou Ginga as Norman
Kenyuu Horiuchi as Buzz
Osamu Kobayashi as Marcus
Yusaku Yara as Alien X
Hideyuki Tanaka as Sander
Kaneto Shiozawa as Scott
Keiko Han as Moira
Michitaka Kobayashi as Raymond
Shigeru Muroi as Catherine

Production
Roots Search is directed by Hisashi Sugai, whose only other credit is as a producer for the MD Geist.

Release
It was released on laserdisc and VHS in the United States. The soundtrack was released on vinyl record.

Reception
On Anime News Network, Justin Sevakis said "There is simply nothing good about Roots Search. It's stupid, ugly, badly dated, and annoying." Other reviewers noted the similarities to the film Alien, going so far as to call it "derivative dreck".

References

External links

1980s science fiction horror films
1986 anime OVAs
1986 horror films
Direct-to-video horror films
Direct-to-video science fiction films
Horror anime and manga
Japanese direct-to-video films
Japanese animated science fiction films
Japanese science fiction horror films
1986 films